Włodowice may refer to the following places in Poland:
Włodowice, Silesian Voivodeship, town in southern Poland
Włodowice, Lower Silesian Voivodeship, village in south-western Poland